Rein Haljand (born on 12 May 1945 in Tallinn) is an Estonian swimmer, sport personnel and sport pedagogue.

In 1966 he graduated from Tallinn Pedagogical Institute in physical education.

1962-1967 he become 6-times Estonian champion in different swimming disciplines. 1960-1968 he was a member of Estonian national swimming team and competed in backstroke and freestyle.

1989-2016 he was a member of Estonian Olympic Committee; 1997-2000 its general secretary, 2000-2001 its vice-president.

1992-1996 he was the president of Estonian Swimming Federation.

Since 1966 he is teaching at Tallinn Pedagogical Institute.

Awards
 2010: Order of the White Star, IV class.

References

Living people
1945 births
Estonian male backstroke swimmers
Estonian male freestyle swimmers
Estonian people in sports
Recipients of the Order of the White Star, 4th Class
Tallinn University alumni
Academic staff of Tallinn University
Swimmers from Tallinn
20th-century Estonian people